Padre Jean (or Padrejean) was a slave on the island of Hispaniola. In 1676, he attempted to overthrow his slavemaster and consequently form a revolution. This occurred in the town of Port-de-Paix. This is stated to have been the spark that led to the eventual Haitian Revolution. He freed slaves and fled to Tortuga Island. He lived there until 1679 when his location was discovered.  After this the French sent some maroons who killed him.

See also 

 Slavery in Haiti
 Haitian Revolution
 Independence of Haiti
 Armée Indigène
 End of slavery in Haiti
 1791 slave rebellion

References

Year of birth missing
1670s deaths
People of Saint-Domingue
Haitian rebel slaves
Haitian Vodou practitioners